Álvaro Meléndez Tibanez (February 19, 1949 – February 28, 2022) was a Mexican  (Spanish for  professional wrestler), better known as Black Man. He was considered a very talented wrestler, and innovative when it comes to high flying moves.

Tibanez died on February 28, 2022, aged 73.

Professional wrestling career
He is most known for a being part of a tag team, first with White Man, Alberto Muñoz, who formed a fan favorite tag team. The two teamed for a while but never won a tag team title, despite several chances at the Arena Coliseo Tag Team Championship. By 1978 Muñoz dropped the "White Man" character as he was forced to work a reduced schedule due to age and injuries.

Later, Black Man would form Los Fantasticos with Kung Fu and Kato Kung Lee, a very popular trios team from the early 1980s. Black Man would later try to reform Los Fantasticos with Kendo and Avispon Negro, but the trio was never as popular as the originals.  He was once El Santo's high risk move double in a movie. Late in his career he worked under the ring name Celestial, complete with a new mask and outfit to not reveal his real identity.

Championships and accomplishments
Universal Wrestling Association
UWA World Lightweight Championship (1 time)
UWA World Trios Championship (1 time) – with Kung Fu and Kato Kung Lee
UWA World Welterweight Championship (3 times)

Luchas de Apuestas record

Footnotes

References

1949 births
2022 deaths
Mexican male professional wrestlers
People from Guadalajara, Jalisco
Professional wrestlers from Jalisco
20th-century professional wrestlers
UWA World Trios Champions
UWA World Welterweight Champions
UWA World Lightweight Champions